Harvey Forsyth MacDonald (May 18, 1898 – October 4, 1965) was a Major League Baseball player who played in 13 games for the Philadelphia Phillies in . He was used as a pinch hitter in 11 of his 13 games.

He died October 4, 1965, and was interred at Glenwood Memorial Gardens in Broomall, Pennsylvania.

References

External links

1898 births
1965 deaths
Albright Lions baseball players
Baseball players from New York (state)
Burials at Glenwood Cemetery/Glenwood Memorial Gardens
Philadelphia Phillies players